Chhawani is a place near Amorha in Basti district in the Indian state of Uttar Pradesh.

it is also known as a place of freedom struggle of freedom fighter - State Amorha (also known as Amorha Khas).

It was the main shelter for Indian fighters during the 1857 mutiny, and is noted for a Pipal tree where about 250 freedom fighter were hanged by the British Government in action after the murder of General Fort.

There is Shaheed Smarak Park in memory of freedom fighters. It has been brought into recognition by a great effort of Late Shri Ram Kumar yadav  (Member of Legislative Council ) who was senior Congress Leader.Now it has been renovated by Great effort of Present MLA Shri Ajay Singh .

Geography

Demographics
 India census, Chhawani: is located near Amorha of Basti district in the Indian state of Uttar Pradesh with total of 500 families residing.

Gallery

Arjun And brothers near Tiraha Chhawni bazar basti is very close to Saheed Smarak chhwani

References

Cities and towns in Basti district